Agla Mausam is a 1989 Hindi film starring Supriya Pathak and Pankaj Kapoor. It is directed by Sagar Sarhadi.

Music
"Agla Mausam" - Jagjit Kaur, Pamela Chopra, Savita Saathi
"Dil To Hai Toota Diya Pyar ki" - Jagjit Kaur
"Lehron Men Ravani Hai" - Savita Saathi, Vinod Sehgal
"Na Ja Na Ja Sanwal Yaar Na Ja" - Jagjit Kaur
"Tere Naam Ka Pahen Liya Kangana" - Jagjit Kaur

References

External links
 

1989 films
1980s Hindi-language films
Films scored by Khayyam